Alfred Owen Aldridge (December 16, 1915 – January 29, 2005) was a professor of French and comparative literature, founder-editor of the journal Comparative Literature Studies, and author of books on a wide range of literature studies.

Career
He was born in Buffalo, New York on December 16, 1915. He was awarded degrees by Indiana University, the University of Georgia for his M.S., and Duke University where he took his Ph.D. In 1952-1953 he had started the Fulbright Program in France, which led to his undertaking a second doctorate, on the subject of "La Littérature Comparée" which he completed at the University of Paris in 1955. Following his doctorates he was employed in the department of English at the University of Maryland, then in 1967 became professor of French and comparative literature at the University of Illinois.

He published widely and became well known as a pioneer of colonial American literary studies and as an explorer of east–west literary relations. He served as president of the American Comparative Literature Association. In 1963 together with Melvin J. Friedman he founded the journal Comparative Literature Studies, which he edited or co-edited for many years. He retired in 1986 and died on January 29, 2005.

Legacy
The A. Owen Aldridge Prize was established in his memory.

Honors
Following his retirement his lifetime's work was awarded the unusual honor by his colleagues of three festschrifts:

Works

References

A. Owen Aldridge Prize details at CLS
A. Owen Aldridge Prize details at ACLA

1915 births
2005 deaths
University of Maryland, College Park faculty